Qaisar (Qaysar or Qeysar) is district situated in the southwestern part of the Faryab province of Afghanistan. In 2021, the population was 400,000 with an ethnic composition of 70% Uzbek (Turkic origin), 16% Tajik, 10% Pashtun and 4% Turkman. The district center Qeysar (1279 m altitude) (Qaisar bazaar), at the edge of the vast desert of Qaisar, has almost the same peculiarities of the Almar bazaar. This bazaar received its name at the end of the nineteenth century.

Qaisar is popular for its great production of grapes and 70% of the district population own grape-gardens. The gardeners export tons of raisins to surrounding provinces in the north of the country and abroad to Russia and India as fresh grapes can not be exported due to transportation problems and bad road conditions.

The district is watered by the river which starts in the Terband-I-Turkistan Mountains and flows into Qaisar. The water source is from snow melts and springs. The temperature ranges between -20C (-4F) in winter and 40C (106F) in summer.

The district is the home of one of the most famous late poets of Afghanistan, Nadim Qaisari, from whom Afghans inherited a valuable poetry book named Dewan Nadim. The book was compiled and published by Information and Culture Department of Faryab Province after his death as it could not be published before due to lack of funding. The book contains the poetry works and cultural activities which Nadim achieved during the period of his life.

2014 floods 
From 24 April to 7 May 2014, flash flooding from heavy rainfall resulted in the destruction of public facilities, roads and agricultural land.  Assessment findings reported that 20 families were affected, seven people died, 700 livestock were killed, 1,000 gardens were damaged and 1,000 jeribs of agricultural land were damaged or destroyed (equivalent to

References

External links 
 Map of Settlements AIMS, May 2002

Districts of Faryab Province